The 1904 Ohio Green and White football team represented Ohio University in the 1904 college football season as an independent. Led by Henry Hart in his first and only year as head coach, the Green and White compiled a record of 2–4–1, being outscored 57–83.

Schedule

References

Ohio
Ohio Bobcats football seasons
Ohio Green and White football